The fifth season of the History Channel television series Top Shot premiered on May 29, 2013. It is an all-star season with all competitors returning from prior seasons.

Unlike past seasons, the players are not assigned to teams, but compete on an individual basis throughout the season. Also, the process of nominating players for elimination is not used. Instead, the lowest-performing players from an individual challenge take part in a "Proving Ground" challenge; the two lowest performers from this step then compete head-to-head in an elimination challenge.

The season was filmed in Santa Clarita, California.

Contestants

Contestants progress

 The player(s) either won an individual challenge or performed well enough to earn immunity from elimination for the current round.
 The player(s) lost an individual challenge, but did not lose a Proving Ground challenge.
 The player lost a Proving Ground challenge, but won an elimination challenge.
 The player lost an elimination challenge and was eliminated.
 The player voluntarily withdrew from the competition.
 The player won the $100,000 grand prize, the title of Top Shot, and a Q5i speedboat.

Episodes

Episode 1: "Best of the Best"

No practice session was held for the individual challenge. The trainer for the elimination challenge was Craig "Sawman" Sawyer, Navy SEALs instructor and former sniper.

Episode 2: "Tricks of the Trade"

 Blake and Kyle tied with 3 points each. The gumball shot was randomly chosen to be replayed as the tiebreaker, and Kyle won 1-0.

The trainer for the squad and elimination challenges was Taran Butler, national/world shotgun champion.

Episode 3: "Pick Your Poison"

The players practiced without a trainer for the individual and elimination challenges.

Episode 4: "Crank Trigger"

The trainer for the individual challenge was Chris Palmer, longbow and traditional archery expert. The trainer for the elimination challenge was Garry James, former Army ordnance officer.

Episode 5: "Shooting Dice"

 Alex, Gabby, and Joe tied for last place with 0 points. For the tiebreaker, each fired one shot at a target from 75 feet, and the two players who hit farthest from the center went to the elimination challenge.

The players practiced without a trainer for the squad and elimination challenges.

Episode 6: "The Mile Shot"

The .338 Lapua Magnum was developed for ultra long-range sniper operations in the Afghanistan and Iraqi Wars. The .338 Lapua bullet can take between 3 and 4 seconds to travel the mile distance to the target. 

The Henry Rifle was changed into the famous Winchester 1866 lever-action rifle. This brass-framed .44 caliber lever-action rifle can fire 28 rounds per minute.

Alatls require skill rather than muscle power. This allowed women and children to participate in hunting. The darts resemble large arrows or thin spears and can be from 4 to 9 feet in length and 3/8" to 5/8" in diameter. Scientists speculate that the atlatl is responsible for the extinction of the woolly mammoth.  

Peter scored 12 points to win the challenge and receive the $2,000 Bass Pro Shops gift card. Alex and Brian tied with 8 points each, so they played a 2-round tiebreaker between themselves. They tied again 3-3 and played one more round, which Brian won 4-2.

The trainers for the individual challenge were George Reinas, season 2 contestant, and Craig "Sawman" Sawyer, Navy SEALs instructor and former sniper. The trainer for the elimination challenge was Jack Dagger, primitive weapons expert.

Episode 7: "Thread the Needle"

The players practiced without a trainer for the individual and elimination challenges.

Episode 8: "Familiar Foes"

The trainer for the squad challenge was Taran Butler, national/world shotgun champion. The trainer for the elimination challenge was Rick Pohlers, cannon expert.

Episode 9: "Big Boom"

The players practiced without a trainer for the squad challenge. The trainer for the elimination challenge was Chris Brackett, archery expert.

Episode 10: "Zip or Ship"

The players practiced without a trainer for the individual and elimination challenges.

Episode 11: "A Game of Horse"

After the fifth round, Chris had made 3 shots to 1 each for Brian and William, guaranteeing the win. Both of them missed their final shot, forcing a two-round tiebreaker with each player choosing one weapon. Brian won 2–0.

The trainer for the individual challenge was Craig "Sawman" Sawyer, Navy SEALs instructor and former sniper. Instead of returning to the house for a celebratory dinner as in past seasons, the four finalists hiked into a nearby valley for a meal of MRE rations and spent the night camping in a tent.

Episode 12: "Last Man Standing"

No practice sessions were held in this episode. The winners from all four previous seasons returned to watch the final challenge.

References

2013 American television seasons